Zoran Milinković (born 18 July 1968) is a Serbian football manager and former player.

Playing career
Milinković came through the youth system of Partizan, before starting his senior career at lower league club Mladost Petrinja. He returned to Partizan and made two league appearances during the first part of the 1990–91 season, before moving to Vojvodina. Milinković also played for Mogren, Borac Banja Luka, Radnički Niš, Kispest-Honvéd, Tosu Futures, Waregem, Nice, Hansa Rostock, Anorthosis Famagusta and Doxa Katokopia.

Managerial career
Milinković started his managerial career as an assistant manager to Ratko Dostanić at Obilić during the 2002–03 season, before they both left and took up identical roles at Sartid Smederevo ahead of the 2003–04 season. He was appointed as the manager of Obilić in August 2004, but was released after only two months. He then became the manager of BSK Borča, having a lot of success in the following three seasons. He left the club before they made their Serbian SuperLiga debut. After leaving BSK Borča, Milinković had unassuming brief spells at Kolubara and Srem.

In the summer of 2009, he was appointed manager of newly promoted SuperLiga club Spartak Subotica. He also worked at Vojvodina, OFK Beograd, Aris Thessaloniki and Voždovac.

Partizan
On 25 March 2015, Milinković was named manager of FK Partizan after Marko Nikolić was sacked. On 4 April 2015, he made his debut on the bench of Partizan in a 2–1 home win against Radnički Kragujevac. In the spring part of the 2014–15 season, Milinković has returned the title of champion of Serbia to Partizan, which was last season won by Red Star Belgrade. Milinković enrolled 7 wins with Partizan in the Serbian SuperLiga in the spring part of the 2014–15 season and three draws, while in the Serbian Cup he enrolled one win and one defeat.

He began the 2015–16 season in a win over Dila Gori in the second qualifying round for the UEFA Champions League on 14 July 2015. In the Serbian SuperLiga he also had a great start, defeating Metalac Gornji Milanovac 4–0, while in the second round Partizan won against Jagodina 6–0. On 5 August 2015, Milinković and his squad won against Romanian champions Steaua București in the second leg of the third qualifying round for the Champions League and so qualified Partizan to the Champions League qualifying play-off. The last time that Partizan qualified to the Champions League play-off was when it was led by Aleksandar Stanojević in the summer of 2010.

On 26 August 2015, Milinković's Partizan was defeated by BATE Borisov and as a result entered the group stage of the UEFA Europa League.

Honours

Manager
Partizan
Serbian SuperLiga: 2014–15

References

External links

1968 births
Living people
Footballers from Belgrade
Serbian footballers
Association football defenders
FK Partizan players
FK Vojvodina players
FK Mogren players
FK Borac Banja Luka players
FK Radnički Niš players
Budapest Honvéd FC players
K.S.V. Waregem players
OGC Nice players
FC Hansa Rostock players
Anorthosis Famagusta F.C. players
Doxa Katokopias FC players
Yugoslav First League players
Nemzeti Bajnokság I players
Belgian Pro League players
Ligue 1 players
Ligue 2 players
Bundesliga players
Cypriot First Division players
Serbian football managers
FK Obilić managers
FK BSK Borča managers
FK Rad managers
FK Spartak Subotica managers
FK Vojvodina managers
OFK Beograd managers
Aris Thessaloniki F.C. managers
FK Voždovac managers
FK Partizan managers
Anorthosis Famagusta F.C. managers
FK Borac Banja Luka managers
FK Napredak Kruševac managers
Serbian SuperLiga managers
Super League Greece managers
Premier League of Bosnia and Herzegovina managers
Serbian expatriate sportspeople in Australia
Serbian expatriate footballers
Expatriate footballers in Hungary
Serbian expatriate sportspeople in Hungary
Expatriate footballers in Japan
Serbian expatriate sportspeople in Japan
Expatriate footballers in Belgium
Serbian expatriate sportspeople in Belgium
Expatriate footballers in France
Serbian expatriate sportspeople in France
Expatriate footballers in Germany
Serbian expatriate sportspeople in Germany
Expatriate footballers in Cyprus
Serbian expatriate sportspeople in Cyprus
Serbian expatriate football managers
Expatriate football managers in Greece
Serbian expatriate sportspeople in Greece
Expatriate football managers in Bosnia and Herzegovina
Serbian expatriate sportspeople in Bosnia and Herzegovina